Bleue Cove is a cove lying immediately east of Cape Margerie. It was charted and named in 1950 by the French Antarctic Expedition; the name is descriptive of the color of the water, after the French word for "blue".

References
 

Coves of Antarctica
Bodies of water of Adélie Land